Balland is a French surname. Notable people with the surname include:

Antoine Balland (1751–1821), French general
Hervé Balland (born 1964), French cross-country skier
Jean Marie Balland (1934–1998), French Roman Catholic archbishop and cardinal

French-language surnames